The Mowinckel's Third Cabinet governed Norway between 3 March 1933 and 20 March 1935. It had the following composition:

Cabinet members 

|}

Secretary to the Council of State
Bredo Rolsted

References
Johan Mowinckel's Third Government. 3 March 1933 - 20 March 1935 - Government.no

Notes

Mowinckel 3
Mowinckel 3
1933 establishments in Norway
1935 disestablishments in Norway
Cabinets established in 1933
Cabinets established in 1935